The 2009–10 Etisalat Emirates Cup was the 2nd staging of the Etisalat Emirates Cup. The competition started on October 8, 2009 and concluded on May 21, 2009.

Round One Groups 
12 clubs were drawn into 3 groups of 4 teams. The winners and the best runners-up will qualify for the semifinals.

Standings and results

Group A

Group B

Group C

Semi-finals

1st Legs

2nd Legs

Final

UAE League Cup seasons
Etisalat Emirates Cup
Etisalat Emirates Cup